is a retired Japanese female mixed martial arts (MMA) fighter and judoka.

She participated in MMA promotions ReMix, Smackgirl, Shooto and Ax.

Background
She began training in judo while in senior high school and got in the best four in the Kinki senior high school tournament.

Mixed martial arts career
 defeating four-time national judo champion, 1993 and 1998 silver medallist and three-time World Cup winner, Russian Tatyana Kuvshinova via KO.

On , Hoshino was defeated for the first and only time by then debutant Yuka Tsuji via armbar submission at Ax Vol. 2: we want to shine, a shocking upset at the time, when Hoshino was the most accomplished female Japanese MMA fighter.

On , Sunaba drew with Dutch fighter Audrey Kruyning at Shooto - 2/23 in Korakuen Hall. After the bout she declared that she wanted to return with her family in Wakayama and to take a rest from professional activities for a while. She has not fought since then.

Mixed martial arts record

|-
| Draw
| align=center| 9-1-1
| Audrey Kruyning
| Draw (0-1)
| Shooto - 2/23 in Korakuen Hall
| 
| align=center| 2
| align=center| 5:00
| Bunkyo, Tokyo, Japan
| 
|-
| Win
| align=center| 9-1-0
| Tomomi Sunaba
| DQ (kicking a downed opponent)
| Ax Vol. 5
| 
| align=center| 1
| align=center| 0:13
| Bunkyo, Tokyo, Japan
| 
|-
| Win
| align=center| 8-1-0
| Hiromi Oka
| Submission (scarf hold armlock)
| Ax Vol. 3
| 
| align=center| 2
| align=center| 3:09
| Bunkyo, Tokyo, Japan
| 
|-
| Win
| align=center| 7-1-0
| Yoshiko Onoue
| TKO (corner stoppage)
| Shooto: Gig East 8
| 
| align=center| 2
| align=center| 4:38
| Setagaya, Tokyo, Japan
| 
|-
| Loss
| align=center| 6-1-0
| Yuka Tsuji
| Submission (armbar)
| Ax Vol. 2: we want to shine
| 
| align=center| 3
| align=center| 3:37
| Minato, Tokyo, Japan
| 
|-
| Win
| align=center| 6-0-0
| Yuuki Kondo
| Decision (3-0)
| Ax Vol. 1: we do the justice
| 
| align=center| 3
| align=center| 5:00
| Setagaya, Tokyo, Japan
| 
|-
| Win
| align=center| 5-0-0
| Mako Ito
| Submission (straight armbar)
| Smackgirl 4: Burning Night
| 
| align=center| 1
| align=center| 2:18
| Shibuya, Tokyo, Japan
| 
|-
| Win
| align=center| 4-0-0
| Mari Kaneko
| Submission (guillotine choke)
| Smackgirl: Indeed
| 
| align=center| 3
| align=center| 1:50
| Shibuya, Tokyo, Japan
| 
|-
| Win
| align=center| 3-0-0
| Mika Harigai
| Submission (guillotine choke)
| Smackgirl: Fighting Chance
| 
| align=center| 2
| align=center| 4:16
| Shibuya, Tokyo, Japan
| 
|-
| Win
| align=center| 2-0-0
| Akemi Torisu
| KO (knee)
| Smackgirl: Starting Over
| 
| align=center| 1
| align=center| 2:49
| Shibuya, Tokyo, Japan
| 
|-
| Win
| align=center| 1-0-0
| Tatyana Kuvshinova
| KO (punch)
| ReMix Golden Gate 2001
| 
| align=center| 3
| align=center| 1:12
| Shibuya, Tokyo, Japan
|

See also
List of female mixed martial artists

References

External links
 Ikuma Hoshino Awakening Profile

Profile at Fightergirls.com
Official website (Internet Archive) 

1981 births
Living people
Japanese female mixed martial artists
Mixed martial artists utilizing judo
Japanese female judoka
People from Wakayama Prefecture
Flyweight mixed martial artists
21st-century Japanese women